Arthur Edward Osmaston (4 March 1885– 30 June 1972) was a forest officer and naturalist in India. He studied at the Royal Indian Engineering College, Cooper's Hill, and joined the Indian Forest Department in the United Provinces. During his thirty years of service, he studied the birds and flora of the region and wrote numerous papers in the Journal of the Bombay Natural History Society. His collection of bird specimens was given to Hugh Whistler in 1931 and is now in the Natural History Museum at Tring. He was a brother of Bertram Beresford Osmaston.

Publications
 Osmaston A.E. (1929): On the forest types in India. Acta Forestalia Fennica 34(12):3-7. 
 Osmaston, A E (1921): Note on the nidification and habits of some birds in British Garhwal. JBNHS. 28(1):140-160.
 Osmaston, A E (1916): Curious habits of Wood-peckers in the Kumaon hills. JBNHS. 24(2):363-366.
 Osmaston, A E (1913): The birds of Gorakhpur. JBNHS. 22(3):532-549.
 Osmaston, A E (1912): Eggs of the Large Hawk-Cuckoo Hierococcyx sparverioides. JBNHS. 21(4):1330-1331.

Notes

References
 Warr, F. E. 1996. Manuscripts and Drawings in the ornithology and Rothschild libraries of The Natural History Museum at Tring. BOC.

Naturalists of British India
1885 births
1961 deaths
British foresters
Colonial Forest Service officers
British people in colonial India
Alumni of the Royal Indian Engineering College
20th-century British zoologists
20th-century Indian zoologists
Members of the Bombay Natural History Society